Onde Estás Felicidade? is a 1939 Brazilian film produced by Adhemar Gonzaga and directed by Mesquitinha. The film is based on the 1933 novel of the same name by Luis Iglesias.

Cast

References

External links

1930s romance films
1939 films
Brazilian romance films
1930s Portuguese-language films
Cinédia films
Brazilian black-and-white films